The Gujarat Pradesh Congress Committee (GPCC) is the state unit of the Indian National Congress in Gujarat. Jagdish Thakor is the president of the Committee. It has 1,862 seats in various urban and rural local bodies in Gujarat. Its office is located at Rajiv Gandhi Bhawan, Ahmedabad. It is the single major opposition party against the Bharatiya Janata Party in Gujarat. It has participated in every Gujarat Legislative Assembly election since 1962, the first election in the independent state.

History

Pre-independence 
It was formed in 1920 and its first and longest running president was Sardar Vallabhbhai Patel. The GPCC would organize Indian nationalist campaigns during the Indian freedom struggle, and after independence in 1947, it became responsible for supplying candidates of the Congress in local and state election campaigns.

Post-independence 
The party contested its first elections in independent Gujarat in 1962, under the leadership of Jivran Mehta, who won with a strong majority of 113 seats. The party lost a number of seats in 1967, under the leadership of Hitendra Desai, albeit still had a simple majority. However, soon after the election Hitendra Desai defected to the Indian National Congress (Organisation) camp and formed the government with the party. In 1971, president's rule was declared and continued upto the 1972 election. The Congress swept the 1972 election under Ghanshyam Oza, winning 140 of the then-168 seats in the Gujarat Legislative Assembly. In 1973, Chimanbhai Patel replaced Oza as chief minister. The Chimanbai Patel government was dissolved following popular protests against the government as a part of the Navnirman Andolan in 1973-74, against economic crises and corruption in public life. The protests were successful and resulted in the dissolution of the government in 1974. President's rule was established until the next elections. In 1975, the Congress performed badly in the newly-held elections, winning only 75 out of 182 seats. The opposition parties formed the government under Bahubhai J. Patel of the INC(O). However, president's rule was declared in 1976 with Congress forming the government. This government lasted for only 3 months with the Janata Party, the new opposition bloc forming the government again. In 1980 the Congress stormed back to power with over 140 seats under Madhav Solanki. Madhav Solanki's government was extremely popular, and his government returned to power with a bigger majority in 1985. In 1990, the Congress got its lowest tally of seats in the Gujarat assembly ever, at 33. It was badly routed by the BJP-Janata Dal coalition. The Congress however came back to power in 1994. In the 1995 elections, the Congress again lost extremely bad, albeit performed better than the last election, with the BJP securing a huge majority of 121 seats. The Congress continued to perform relatively dismally in various Gujarat elections until 2015, when the Congress stormed into power in many rural local bodies of Gujarat, wiping out the BJP. The Congress also finally managed to make a major breakthrough in the 2017 Gujarat Legislative elections, reducing the number of BJP seats to 99, although it still lost the election by a few seats.

Office
Gujarat Pradesh Congress started functioning at Khamasa, Ahmedabad under leadership of Kantilal Ghiya, the first president. In 1971, it was shifted to Shahpur and then to Hawawala Blocks on Ashram Road, Ahmedabad. During 1977, it was again shifted to Khanpur, which till recently was Ahmedabad City Congress Committee (INC DCC Office). Subsequently to Vikram Chambers on Ashram Road. Finally, the place where Rajiv Bhawan stands at present was handed over to Congress by Hitendrabhai Desai. Gujarat Pradesh Congress Committee is running from this premises, which was inaugurated on 28 December 2006 by Ahmedbhai Patel, Rajya Sabha MP.

Electoral performance

Gujarat Legislative Assembly elections

Office bearers

Working Presidents 
 Ambarish Der
 Himmatsingh Patel
 Indravijaysinh Gohil
 Jignesh Mevani
 Kadir Pirzada
 Rutvik Makwana
 Lalit Kagaratha

See also
 Indian National Congress
 Congress Working Committee
 All India Congress Committee
 Pradesh Congress Committee

References

External links
 

Politics of Gujarat
Indian National Congress by state or union territory